The Castel C-301S was a training glider built in the early 1940s in France. It was a glider of high-wing monoplane configuration.

Specifications

References

Bibliography

Glider aircraft